Louisiana Literature Festival is an annual literary festival which takes place around the third weekend of August at the Louisiana Museum of Modern Art, 35 km (22 mi) north of Copenhagen, Denmark. The festival began in 2010, and each year it features around forty writers from all over the world over a span of four days.

Situated throughout the museum and the sculpture garden, the festival encompasses conversations between writers as well as between writers and critics, readings and various performances.

Background 
Since its opening in 1958, literature has played a special and vital role at the Louisiana Museum of Modern Art. Through the years the museum has welcomed writers and literary events on the same scale as other art forms such as music and architecture. Nordic poetry days have been held at Louisiana, which in the 1980s became a meeting forum for dissident writers from Eastern Europe. In 1992 Louisiana also saw the first public appearance by Salman Rushdie following his fatwa and subsequent years of living in hiding.

In November 1988 Susan Sontag visited Louisiana and stated to a newspaper: "I loved Louisiana. The atmosphere is so special, democratic in a good way, friendly and radiant with a love of art and nature. A kind of model for what a good society could be – both very open and welcoming and in addition of very high standards. As a rule, a high level shuts people out, and openness has a tendency to lower the standard. But you have something that does not make compromises but is at the same time for all. The world should be full of Louisianas – and I don't just mean museums!"

Festival experience 
In connection with their participation in the festival, writers have stated: 

 Ali Smith: “I think that the bringing together of writers and public in a space, which is about art, is the whole gift of this place (…), as soon as you put the arts, different arts, together something transformative happens, you know all the borders get crossed”.
 Patti Smith: “There has been such warmth from the people. Such big gatherings. So much enthusiasm. (…) It’s been stimulating. Everything that I am interested in, I found someone that can teach me something”.
 Günter Grass: “I have been a true fan of this place for many years, and this has been a genuinely fine experience. I also met very nice and interested colleagues”.
 Jonathan Safran Foer: “I would mention to people, friends of mine, artists, writers, that I was coming and many of them said that this was their favorite museum in the world, and it’s easy to understand why. It’s a very unique place”.
 Taiye Selasi: “The scenery is exquisite and it’s small. And I think the two things put together mean you have this really intimate experience here”.

Audio walks 
Each year, authors are invited to write about works from the Louisiana Museum's collection and spaces at the museum. In connection with the festival, the texts are presented as literary sound experiments in the form of audio walks. Contributing writers include Anne Carson, Sjón, Teju Cole, Kenneth Goldsmith, Kiran Desai and Tomomi Adachi.

Louisiana Channel 
Videos from the festival are made available through Louisiana Channel, the English-language web-TV channel.

Selected conversations on stage 

 Siri Hustvedt and Paul Auster. 
 Karl Ove Knausgård and Tomas Espedal. 
 Richard Ford and Colm Tóibín.
 Taiye Selasi and Colum McCann.
 Adonis and Ibrahim al-Koni.
 Leonardo Padura and Yan Lianke.
 Jonathan Safran Foer and Jeffrey Eugenides.

Selected writers on stage 

 Chimamanda Ngozi Adichie.
 Alaa al-Aswany.
 Margaret Atwood.
 Lydia Davis.
 Karl Ove Knausgård.
 Chris Kraus.
 Ian McEwan.
 Herta Müller.
 Joyce Carol Oates.
 Patti Smith. 
 Zadie Smith.

Selected performances 

Tomomi Adachi.
Laurie Anderson.
Anne Carson.

Backstage interviews 

 Adonis.
 César Aira.
 Svetlana Alexievich.
 Hiromi Itō.
 Claudio Magris.
 Javier Marías.
Péter Nádas.
 Eileen Myles.
 Sally Rooney.
 Samanta Schweblin meets Valeria Luiselli.
 Ngugi wa Thiong’o.
 Olga Tokarczuk.

Writers exploring art at the Louisiana 

 Siri Hustvedt on the experience of art.
 Colm Tóibín on Giacometti.
 Daniel Kehlmann, James McBride and Sjón on Olafur Eliasson’s installation Riverbed.

Louisiana Literature 2022-2010

2022 
Featuring Solvej Balle (DK), Claire-Louise Bennett (UK), Emeli Bergman (DK), Johanne Bille (DK), Viggo Bjerring (DK), Knud Brix (DK), Natasha Brown (UK), Rasmus Daugbjerg (DK), Liv Nimand Duvå (DK), Bernardine Evaristo (UK), Niels Frank (DK), Merete Pryds Helle (DK), Judith Hermann (DE), Tine Høeg (DK), Anna Juul (DK), Josefine Klougart (DK), Benjamin Koppel (DK), Benjamín Labatut (CL), Marianne Larsen (DK), Ben Lerner (US), Kristian Leth (DK), Deborah Levy (DK), Cevilie Lind (DK), Édouard Louis (FR), Joakim Kruse Lykke (DK), Line-Maria Lång (DK), Iben Mondrup (DK), Sebastian Nathan (DK), Rasmus Nikolajsen (DK), Ingrid Nymo (DK), Pola Oloixarac (AR), Morten Pape (DK), Torrey Peters (US), Marieke Lucas Rijneveld (NL), Alex Schulman (SE), Jón Kalman Stefánsson (IS), Maria Stepanova (RU), Nanna Storr-Hansen (DK), Pia Tafdrup (DK), Carl Frode Tiller (NO), Linn Ullmann (NO), Harald Voetmann (DK), Ocean Vuong (VN/US), Dorrit Willumsen (DK).

For children: Thomas Korsgaard & Frida Brygmann (DK), Martin Brygmann (DK), 

Performances by Laurie Anderson (US), Koleka Putuma (Guldimund (DK), Jessie Kleeman (GR), Ømhedsaktivisme med Melanie Kitti (DK), Sidsel Ana Walden (DK), Gruy Stokkendahl Dalgas (DK), Birgit Bundesen (DK), Poems by Hafez, performed by Hamid Tadayoni (IR), Shëkufe Tadayoni Heiberg (DK), Morten Søndergaard (DK), Mona Fallah (IR).

Audio walks by Luka Holmegaard (DK), Glenn Bech (DK), Emeli Bergman (DK), Christina Hesselholdt (DK), Laurie Anderson (US), Claire-Louise Bennett (UK)

2019 
Featuring Molly Balsby (DK), Thomas Boberg (DK), Mathilde Walter Clark (DK), Robert Crumb (US), Aline Kominsky-Crumb (US), Rachel Cusk (UK), Tomas Espedal (NO), Matias Faldbakken (NO), Karen Fastrup (DK), Kristian Bang Foss (DK), C.Y. Frostholm (DK), Roxane Gay (US), Lisa Halliday (US), Isabella Hammad (UK), Helle Helle (DK), Christina Hesselholdt (DK), Michel Houellebecq (FR), Siri Ranva Hjelm Jacobsen (DK), René Jean Jensen (DK), Anna Juul (DK),  László Krasznahorkai (HU), Jens Kæmpe (DK), Amalie Langballe (DK), Jørgen Leth (DK), Johannes Lilleøre (DK), Pablo Llambías (DK), Mazen Maarouf (LB), Mette Moestrup (DK), Sayaka Murata (JP), Madame Nielsen (DK), Henrik Nordbrandt (DK), Ben Okri (NI/UK), Shahrnush Parsipur (IR), Per Petterson (NO), Dy Plambeck (DK), Peter Poulsen (DK), Claudia Rankine (US), Elif Shafak (TR/UK), Manu Sareen (DK), Sjón (IS), Nicolaj Stochholm (DK), Kristina Stoltz (DK), Nanna Storr-Hansen (DK), Sara Stridsberg (SE), Eva Tind (DK), Anne Waldman (US), Dorrit Willumsen (DK), Nikolaj Zeuthen (DK)

Performances by Claus Hempler (DK), Henrik Nordbrandt & Channe Nussbaum (DK), Katarzyna Fetlińska (PL), Lise Westzynthius & Bjørn Rasmussen (DK), BMS (Dorte Limkilde, Mette Kierstein, Ronja Jacobsen, Fine Gråbøl), Den Sorte Skole (DK)

Audio Walks by Richard Ford (US), Georgi Gospodinov (BG), Hiromi Ito (JP), Tahar Ben Jelloun (MA), Peter Laugesen (DK), Guadalupe Nettel (MX), Chigozie Obioma (NI), Colm Tóibín (IR), Gunnhild Øuyehaug (NO)

2018 
Featuring Vita Andersen (DK), Johannes Anyuru (SE), Emma Bess (DK), Anne Carson (CA), Teju Cole (US/NI), CAConrad (US), Niels Fredrik Dahl (NO), Pernille Abd-El Dayem (DK), Jonas Eika (DK), Mariana Enriquez (AR), Niels Frank (DK), Georgi Gospodinov (BG), Katrine Marie Guldager (DK), Helle Helle (DK), Merete Pryds Helle (DK), Hiromi Itō (JP), Tahar Ben Jelloun (MA), Pia Juul (DK), Daniel Kehlmann (AU/DE), Jan Kjærstad (NO), Thomas Korsgaard (DK), Christian Kracht (CH), Peter Laugesen (DK), Kim Leine (DK), Svend Åge Madsen (DK), Javier Marías (ES), Julie Mendel (DK), Péter Nádas (HU), Guadalupe Nettel (MX), Dorthe Nors (DK), Morten Pape (DK), Olga Ravn (DK), Knud Romer (DK), Sally Rooney (IR), Leonora Christina Skov (DK), Domenico Starnone (IT), Yoko Tawada (JP), Hanne Højgaard Viemose (DK), Delphine de Vigan (FR), Joakim Vilandt (DK), Harald Voetmann (DK), Jepser Wung-Sung (DK), Theis Ørntoft (DK), Gunnhild Øyehaug (NO). 

Performances by Ars Nova (DK), Kira Skov (DK), Lars Skinnebach & Goodiepal (DK), Anne Carson (CA), Orlando by Elisa Kragerup (DK), Peter Laugesen (DK). Reading for children by Anne Sofie Hammer (DK). 

Audio walks by Anne Carson (CA), Inger Christensen (DA), Adda Djørup (DK), Caroline Albertine Minor (DK), Iben Mondrup (DK), Andreas Pedersen (DK), Lars Skinnebach (DK), Yoko Tawada (JP).

2017 
Featuring Lone Aburas (DK), Peter Adolphsen (DK), Naja Marie Aidt (DK), Svetlana Alexievich (BY), Paul Auster (US), Thomas Boberg (DK), Suzanne Brøgger (DK), Álvaro Enrigue (MX), Christina Hagen (DK), Ida Marie Hede (DK), Maria Helleberg (DK), Christina Hesselholdt (DK), Vigdis Hjorth (NO), Yu Hua (CH), Siri Hustvedt (US), Josefine Klougart (DK), Linda Boström Knausgård (SE), Thomas Korsgaard (DK), Chris Kraus (US), Jørgen Leth (DK), Pablo Llambías (DK), Édouard Louis (FR), Valeria Luiselli (MX), Viggo Madsen (DK), Imbolo Mbue (CM), Ib Michael (DK), Caroline Albertine Minor (DK), Eileen Myles (US), Jenny Offill (US), Andreas Pedersen (DK), Cia Rinne (SE), Samanta Schweblin (AR), Amalie Smith (DK), Zadie Smith (GB), Nanna Storr-Hansen (DK), Malte Tellerup (DK), Harald Voetmann (DK), Colson Whitehead (US), Peter-Clement Woetmann (DK). 

Performances by Laurie Anderson (US), Nástio Mosquito (AO), Tomomi Adachi (JP), Valby Vokalgruppe (DK). 

Laurie Anderson's virtual reality work 'Chalkroom' (2017) was installed in the museum cinema during the festival. A couple of weeks later it won for 'Best VR Experience' at the Venice Film festival 2017. 

Audio walks by Pernille Abd-El Dayem (DK), Claus Handberg (DK), Merete Pryds Helle (DK), Cecilie Lind (DK), Valeria Luiselli (MX), Klaus Lynggaard (DK), Thomas Rydahl (DK), Ursula Scavenius (DK).

2016 
Featuring Benny Andersen (DK), Julian Barnes (UK), Caroline Bergvall (NO/FR), Tomas Espedal (NO), Trisse Gejl (DK), Beate Grimsrud (NO), Jens Christian Grøndahl (DK), Merete Pryds Helle (DK), Peder Frederik Jensen (DK), Erica Jong (DK), Jonas Hassen Khemiri (SE), Karl Ove Knausgård (NO), Maja Lucas (DK), Tomas Lagermand Lundme (DK), Hannah Lutz (DK), Klaus Lynggaard (DK), Claudio Magris (IT), Alen Meskovic (DK), Maja Mittag (DK), Jóanes Nielsen (FA), Chigozie Obioma (NG), Morten Pape (DK), Halfdan Pisket (DK), Bjørn Rasmussen (DK), Steve Roggenbuck (US), Rike Scheffler (DE), Kristina Stoltz (DK), Abdellah Taïa (MA), Olga Ravn (DK), Søren Ulrik Thomsen (DK), Kirsten Thorup (DK), Olga Tokarczuk (PL), Linn Ullmann (NO), Carl-Henning Wijkmark (SE), Dorrit Willumsen (DK); Hanya Yanagihara (US), Nell Zink (US), Jess Ørnsbo (DK). 

Performances by Bisse (DK), Lone Hørslev (DK), Jens Blendstrup & Girls in Airports (DK), Ursula Andkjær Olsen & Stense Andrea Lind-Valdan (DK) 

Poetry maraton by Pejk Malinovski (DK), Kirsten Thorup (DK), Anders Abildgaard (DK), Lea Marie Løppenthin (DK), Klaus Lynggaard (DK), Cecilie Lind (DK), Rasmus Nikolajsen (DK), Ursula Andkjær Olsen (DK), Rasmus Halling Nielsen (DK), Morten Søndergaard (DK), Bjørn Rasmussen (DK), Naja Marie Aidt & Mette Moestrup (DK), Jóanes Nielsen (FA), Peter Laugesen (DK). 

Audio walks by Caspar Eric (DK), Erica Jong (US), Peter Laugesen (DK), Sidsel Falsig Pedersen (DK), Bjørn Rasmussen (DK), Steve Roggenbuck (US), Hanne Højgaard Viemose (DK), Kirsten Thorup (DK).

2015 
Featuring Suzanne Brøgger (DK), Marie Darrieussecq (FR), Adda Djørup (DK), Hans Magnus Enzensberger (DE), Caspar Eric (DK), Richard Ford (US), Jonas Gardell (SE), Signe Gjessing (DK), Kenneth Goldsmith (US), Jens Christian Grøndahl (DK), Josefine Gråkjær Nielsen (DK), Kirsten Hamman (DK), Kamilla Hega Holst (DK), Hanne Højgaard Viemose (DK), Carsten Jensen (DK), Niviaq Korneliussen (DK/GR), Rachel Kushner (US), Marianne Larsen (DK), Kim Leine (DK), Jørgen Leth (DK), Yan Lianke (CH), Preben Major Sørensen (DK), Iben Mondrup (DK), Henrik Nordbrandt (DK), Leonardo Padura (CU), Signe Parkins (DK), Lyudmila Petrushevskaya (RU), Stine Pilgaard (DK), Olga Ravn (DK), Clemens Setz (AT), Jens Smærup Sørensen (DK), Vladimir Sorokin (RU), Rolf Sparre Johansson (DK), Sara Stridsberg (SE), Colm Tóibín (IR), Rikke Villadsen (DK), Harald Voetmann (DK), Ngugi wa Thiong'o (KE), Christel Wiinblad (DK) Kim Fupz Aakesen (DK). 

Performances by Sort Samvittighed (DK), Niels Skousen (DK), Synd og Skam (DK), Lyudmila Petrushevskaya (RU), Iben Mondrup & Nils Lassen (DK).

Audio walk by Peter Adolphsen (DK), Lars Frost (DK), Kenneth Goldsmith (US), Ida Marie Hede (DK), Rasmus Halling Nielsen (DK), Lea Marie Løppenthin (DK), Colm Tóibín (IR), Merete Torp (DK).

2014 
Featuring Naja Marie Aidt (DK), Alaa al-Aswany (EG), Lena Andersson (SE), Margaret Atwood (CA), Teju Cole (NG/US), Lydia Davis (US), Péter Esterházy (HU), Athena Farrokhzad (SE), Signe Gjessing (DK), Kristina Nya Glaffey (DK), Katrine Marie Guldager (DK), Helle Helle (DK), Christina Hesselholdt (DK), Hanne-Vibeke Holst (DK), Peter Højrup (DK), Roy Jacobsen (NO), Peder Frederik Jensen (DK), Pia Juul (DK), Daniel Kehlmann (AT/DE), Josefine Klougart (DK), Line Knutzon (DK), Maja Lee Langvad (DK), Lea Marie Løppenthin (DK), Eske K. Mathiesen (DK), James McBride (US), Philipp Meyer (US), Mette Moestrup (DK), David Mitchell (UK), Nielsen (DK), Herta Müller (RO/DE), Kaspar Colling Nielsen (DK), Joyce Carol Oates (US), Dorthe Nors (DK), Dy Plambeck (DK), Michael Ondaatje (CA), Sjón (IS), Jacob Skyggebjerg (DK), Harald Voetmann (DK), Herbjørg Wassmo (NO), Theis Ørntoft (DK).

Performances by 'Vi Sidder Bare Her' featuring Jørgen Leth (DK), T.S. Høeg and Peter Peter (DK), Skammens Vogn featuring Nikolaj Zeuthen (DK), Fire Konger featuring Jim Black (US) and Peter Laugesen (DK). 

Audio walk by Lone Aburas (DK), Teju Cole (NG/US), Christina Hagen (DK), Peder Frederik Jensen (DK), Marianne Larsen (DK), Nina Malinovski (DK), Sjón (IS), Theis Ørntoft (DK).

2013 
Featuring Anders Abildgaard (DK), Lone Aburas (DK), Peter Adolphsen (DK), Ursula Andkjær Olsen (DK), Johannes Anyuru (SE), Peter Asmussen (DK), Solvej Balle (DK), Suzanne Brøgger (DK), Morten Chemnitz (DK), Christian Dorph (DK), Sidsel Falsig Pedersen (DK), Niels Frank (DK), Katarina Frostenson (SE), Olga Grjasnowa (DE), Einar Már Guðmundsson (IS), Katrine Marie Guldager (DK), Erling Jepsen (DK), Ida Jessen (DK), Janina Katz (DK), Rune T. Kidde (DK), Nick Laird (IE), Waciny Laredj (DZ), Rosa Liksom (FI), Erlend Loe (NO), Svend Åge Madsen (DK), Colum McCann (US), Ian McEwan (UK), Caroline Albertine Minor (DK), Iben Mondrup (DK), Henrik Nordbrandt (DK), Asta Olivia Nordenhof (DK), Sofi Oksanen (FI), Antonio Pennacchi (IT), Per Petterson (NO), Hassan Preisler (DK), Bjørn Rasmussen (DK, Klaus Rifbjerg (DK), Jonas Rolsted (DK), Taiye Selasi (UK), Fredrik Sjöberg (SE), Zadie Smith (UK). 

Performances by Jenny Hval (NO), Tomomi Adachi (JP), Olof Olsson (DK) and Martin Ryum (DK). 

Audio walk by Tomomi Adachi (JP), Thomas Boberg (DK), Mette Moestrup (DK), Asta Olivia Nordenhof (DK), Dy Plambeck (DK), Mikkel Thykier (DK), Harald Voetman (DK), Yoko Ono (JP/US).

2012 
Featuring Naja Marie Aidt (DK), César Aira (ARG), Kristina Bang Foss (DK), Thomas Boberg (DK), Anne Carson (CAN), Kiran Desai (IND), Kerstin Ekman (SE), Tomas Espedal (NO), Jeffrey Eugenides (US), Simon Fruelund (DK), Christina Hagen (DK), Rasmus Halling Nielsen (DK), Christina Hesselholdt (DK), Alan Hollinghurst (GB), Christian Jungersen (DK), Pia Juul (DK), Anne Lise Marstrand-Jørgensen (DK), Nicole Krauss (US), Mara Lee (SE), Kim Leine (DK), Henning Mankell (SE), Hisham Matar (LY), Mette Moestrup (DK), Henning Mortensen (DK), Nielsen (DK), Stine Pilgaard (DK), Olga Ravn (DK), Cia Rinne (SE), Jonathan Safran Foer (US), Judith Schalansky (D), Amalie Smith (DK), Patti Smith (US), Jens Smærup Sørensen (DK), Göran Sonnevi (SE), Morten Søndergaard (DK), Pia Tafdrup (DK), Linn Ullmann (SE), David Vann (US). 

Performances by Cia Rinne (SE), Dråbers Logik (DK), and Morten Søndergaard and Randi Pontoppidan (DK). 

Audio walk by Nicole Krauss (US), Kiran Desai (IND), Christel Wiinblad (DK), Olga Ravn (DK), Stine Pilgaard (DK), Eva Tind Kristensen (DK), Mayse Aimo-Boot (DK) and Amalie Smith (DK).

2011 
Featuring Adonis (SY), Ibrahim al-Koni (LY), Chimamanda Ngozi Adichie (NG), Kjell Askildsen (N), Jonas T. Bengtsson (DK), Alberto Blanco (MEX), Linda Boström Knausgård (SE), Junot Díaz (DO/US), Gyrdir Eliasson (IS), Lars Frost (DK), Rasmus Graff (DK), David Grossman (IL), Kirsten Hammann (DK), Helle Helle (DK), Hanne Højgaard Viemose (DK), Carsten Jensen (DK), René Jean Jensen (DK), Josefine Klougart (DK), Karl Ove Knausgård (NO), Marianne Larsen (DK), Peter Laugesen (DK), Jørgen Leth (DK), Märta Tikkanen (FI), Yiyun Li (CN/US), DBC Pierre (AU), Dy Plambeck (DK), Merete Pryds Helle (DK), Marilynne Robinson (US); Lars Saabye Christensen (NO), Steve Sem-Sandberg (SE), Gary Shteyngart (US); Lars Skinnebach (DK), Julie Sten-Knudsen (DK), Nicolaj Stochholm (DK), Morten Søkilde (DK), Søren Ulrik Thomsen (DK), Kirsten Thorup (DK), Ilija Trojanow (BG/DE), Dorrit Willumsen (DK), Harald Voetmann (DK), Juli Zeh (DE).

Performances by Klimakrisen (DK), Yoyooyoy (DK), Always Now Slowly (DK), Tre Konger (DK) and Simona Abdallah (DK). 

Audio walk featuring Jens Blendstrup (DK), Junot Díaz (DO/US), Line Knutzon (DK), Kristina Nya Glaffey og Maja Lee Langvad (DK), Pejk Malinovski (DK), Gary Shteyngart (RU/US), Morten Søndergaard (DK).

2010 
Featuring Naja Marie Aidt (DK), Das Beckwerk (DK), Jens Blendstrup (DK), Suzanne Brøgger (DK), Shane Brox (DK), Kerstin Ekman (S), Tomas Espedal (NO), Tua Forsström (FI), Niels Frank (DK), Günter Grass (DE), Hallgrímur Helgason (IS), Pia Juul (DK), Josefine Klougart (DK), Karl Ove Knausgård (N), Line Knutzon (DK), Eva Tind Kristensen (DK), Martin Larsen (DK), Franck Leibovici (F), Pablo Llambías (DK), John Ajvide Lindqvist (SE), Mette Moestrup (DK), Pejk Malinovski (DK), Flemming Quist Møller (DK), Henrik Nordbrandt (DK), Sofi Oksanen (FI), Ursula Andkjær Olsen (DK), Klaus Rifbjerg (DK), Knud Romer (DK), Lars Skinnebach (DK), Leonora Christina Skov (DK), Ali Smith (UK), Amalie Smith (DK), Dag Solstad (NO), Jón Kalman Stefánsson (IS), Sara Stridsberg (SE), Morten Søndergaard (DK), Pia Tafdrup (DK), Jean-Philippe Toussaint (B), Kevin Vennemann (D), Theis Ørntoft (DK). 

Dramatic monologues were played in the museum's cinema: Primo Levi If This Is a Man, performed by Danish actor Jens Albinus, and Elfriede Jelinek Jackie, performed by Danish actor Solbjørg Højfeldt. 

A filmed conversation between French artist Sophie Calle and Danish writer Das Beckwerk was also shown at the festival. The subject of the conversation was 'self-burial'. 

Audio walk by Palle Sigsgaard (DK), Ursula Andkjær Olsen (DK), René Jean Jensen (DK), Pia Juul (DK), Niels Frank (DK), Martin Larsen (DK), Morten Søkilde (DK), Anne Carson (CAN).

External links 

 Official website.
 Louisiana Channel.
 A Report in Spanish on Infobae, 2022

References 

literary festivals